The 2016 Scottish Parliament election was held on Thursday 5 May 2016 to elect 129 members to the Scottish Parliament. It was the fifth general election since the parliament was re-established in 1999.

Polling data

Graphical summary
The constituency vote is shown as semi-transparent lines, while the regional vote is shown in full lines.

Constituency Vote (FPTP)

2016

2015

2014

2013

2012

2011

Regional Vote (AMS)

Graphical summary

2016

2015

2014

2013

2012

2011

Footnotes

References

 

Scotland
Opinion polling for Scottish Parliament elections
Opinion polling for United Kingdom votes in the 2010s